The 1993 season of the Philippine Basketball League (PBL).

League crisis
With the massive exodus of top amateur players to the pro ranks, the Philippine Basketball League (PBL) suffered and were in a state of being a slowly dying league, when it opened on March 27 at the Cuneta Astrodome, there was no TV nor radio coverage, the media and the sports pages didn't give the PBL the much needed attention and the biggest stumbling block was no network was willing to air the PBL games and it is still doubtful whether the league will have its own television coverage for the season.

Occurrences
The Triple-V Foodmasters, winners of three of the last four conferences, decided to disband their franchise at the start of the season. Last year's three-time finalist Sta.Lucia Realtors has moved over to the pro ranks as a new ballclub in the PBA, their PBL team was sold to Otto Shoes. 
League officials found a venue before the season got off to a start, every Monday and Wednesday, they will be playing at the ULTRA. On Saturday, action shifts to the Cuneta Astrodome in Pasay.
10 PBL players namely; Dennis Espino, Rey Evangelista, Kenneth Duremdes, Marlou Aquino, Patrick Fran, Noli Locsin, Boybits Victoria, Richie Ticzon, Edward Feihl and Expedito Falcasantos were bound by the league rule prohibiting them from taking a leave of absence during a PBL tournament without permission of their mother teams and had to make a difficult decision the night they were to leave for Hong Kong for the 22-under ABC tournament, the players held a meeting and decided to stay put in the PBL. The 10 players were indefinitely suspended by the Basketball Association of the Philippines (BAP).
Philip "Popoy" Juico became the new PBL commissioner after the Maharlika Cup tournament, replacing Ogie Narvasa, the next offing was named after President Fidel V. Ramos, wherein Juico was part of President Ramos' cabinet members. The PBL President Ramos Cup opened on October 16 at the Araneta Coliseum.

Participating teams (coach)
Nikon Home Appliances (Orly Castelo) *New team
Casino Rubbing Alcohol (Willie Generalao)
Burger Machine (Perry Ronquillo)
Otto Shoes (Adonis Tierra)
Instafood Mealmasters (Francis Rodriguez) *Formerly Magnolia 
Rica Hotdogs (Roehl Nadurata) *Formerly Swift
Chowking Fastfood Kings (Joel Banal) *New team in the President Ramos Cup

Maharlika Cup

Burger Machine and Instafood finish on top of the standings after the eliminations with 7-3 won-loss slates. In the semifinal round, newcomer Nikon Appliances won six of their eight assignments to advance into the championship against Burger Machine.

Behind the likes of Noli Locsin, Rey Evangelista, Jeffrey Cariaso and Rudolf Belmonte, Nikon won their first title in their very first participated conference, winning over the Burger Specialists, three games to two, in the finals series.

Finals series

President Ramos Cup

Burger Machine earn their second trip to the finals in the season. The Chicken Burgers finish the two-round semifinals in a three-way tie with Instafood and Otto Shoes with identical 13 wins and 7 losses, but they automatically clinch the first finals slot by virtue of a better quotient.

Instafood ousted Otto Shoes, 58–56, in a playoff to set up a finals showdown with Burger Machine.

In the championship series, the Mealmasters led two games to one, but the Chicken Burgers extended the series by taking Game Four, 85-78, and won their first championship by edging out the Mealmasters, 64–62, in the deciding fifth game.

Finals series

References

External links
 www.philippinebasketball.ph

1993 Philippine Basketball League season
1993 in Philippine basketball